Risto Uolevi Jalo (born July 18, 1962) is a Finnish retired professional ice hockey player and current general manager of Ilves in the Finnish Liiga. He played in the SM-liiga with KOOVEE, Ilves, and HPK between 1979 and 1998. He also played 3 games in the National Hockey League with the Edmonton Oilers during the 1985–86 season. Internationally Jalo played for the Finnish national team at several tournaments, including four World Championships and the 1984 Winter Olympics. In 2004 he was inducted into the Finnish Hockey Hall of Fame. He served as general manager of Ilves from 1999 to 2004, and again since 2017.

Career statistics

Regular season and playoffs

International

References

External links
 
 Finnish Hockey Hall of Fame bio

1962 births
Living people
Edmonton Oilers players
Finnish ice hockey centres
HPK players
Ice hockey players at the 1984 Winter Olympics
Ice hockey players with retired numbers
Ilves players
KOOVEE players
Olympic ice hockey players of Finland
People from Humppila
SHC Fassa players
Sportspeople from Kanta-Häme
Washington Capitals draft picks